Wolfpack is a Belgian DJ and production duo from Willebroek, formed in 2011.

Biography
Very close to Dimitri Vegas & Like Mike, Steve Braet and Ruben Khaza are from Willebroek, as the duo. Appreciated for their electro house style, the group will release all their singles on the label Smash The House (sub-label Spinnin' Records).

The duo has reached twice the 1st place in the top 100 established by Beatport with the singles "Turn it up" (with Dimitri Vegas & Like Mike, GTA) and "Ocarina" (with Dimitri Vegas & Like Mike).

Awards and nominations

Discography

Charting singles

Singles and extended plays
 2012: Rising Moon [Smash The House]
 2013: Miracle (with Dimitri Vegas & Like Mike Remix) [Smash The House]
 2013: Turn It Up (with Dimitri Vegas & Like Mike vs. GTA) [Musical Freedom]
 2013: Ocarina (The TomorrowWorld Anthem) (with Dimitri Vegas & Like Mike) [Smash The House]
 2014: H.A.M. (with Ale Mora) [Smash The House]
 2014: Jump (with Bobby Puma) [Smash The House]
 2014: Sirens [Dim Mak Records]
 2014: We Are One (with We Are Loud) [Smash The House]
 2014: What Does This Button Do (with Aarow) [Smash The House]
 2015: Drop The Smiley (with Funk D featuring Fatman Scoop) [Smash The House]
 2015: You (with DIMARO) [Free Download/Smash The House]
 2015: Wallcreeper (with Jimmy Clash) [Free Download/Smash The House]
 2016: Phatt Bass 2016 (with Warp Brothers) [Smash The House]
 2016:  Light the Sky (with Regi featuring Alessia) [Mostiko]
 2016: GO! (with Avancada) (Dimitri Vegas & Like Mike Remix) [Smash The House]
 2016: Nashville (with Diego Miranda) [Smash The House]
 2016: Loknez (with BOOSTEDKIDS) [Smash The House]
 2017: Point Break (with Diego Miranda) [Smash The House]
 2017: Cactus (with Futuristic Polar Bears featuring X-Tof) [Smash The House]
 2017: Like Air (with NERVO) [Got Me Baby! Records]
 2017: Destiny (with Futuristic Polar Bears featuring Shurakano) [Smash The House]
 2018: Moksha (with Futuristic Polar Bears) [Cmmd Records]
 2018: Riot (featuring Exploits, Leo, and Nweli)
 2018: Zero Fs Given (with Bassjackers) [Smash The House]
 2018: Derb (with Futuristic Polar Bears) [Smash The House]
 2019: Apache (with Eastblock Bitches) [Smash The House]
 2019: We Got This (with 22 Bullets) (Futuristic Polar Bears Edit) [Cmmd Records]
 2019: Unleash The Beast (with Tony Junior) [Smash The House]
 2019: Elev8 (with Diego Miranda featuring Fatman Scoop) [Smash The House]
 2019: Tear Me Apart [Smash The House]
 2019: Be Strong (with Vinny featuring Joshua Khane) [Smash The House]
 2019: Arabian Bounce (with X-TOF, Fatman Scoop and Mike Bond) [Smash The House]
 2019: Carnival (with Timmy Trumpet and Mattn) (Dimitri Vegas & Like Mike Edit) [Smash The House]
 2020: Lord Of The Rave (with Futuristic Polar Bears and Nick Havsen) [Smash The House/Generation Smash]
 2020: Moving Mountains (featuring Jonathan Mendelsohn) [Smash The House]
 2020: Old Money (with Bassjackers featuring Richie Loop) [Smash The House]
 2020: Make Some Noise (with Mike Bond and Fatman Scoop) [Smash The House]
 2020: Sound The Alarm (with Richie Loop and Jimmy Clash) [Smash The House]
 2020: Halloween (with Bassjackers and Baba Yega) [Smash The House]
 2020: Kalahari (with Jaxx & Vega) [Smash The House]
 2021: By My Side (with Jerry Dávila featuring Jonathan Mendelsohn) [Smash The House]
 2021: Superstar (with Angemi and Flaremode) [Smash The House/Smash Deep]
 2021: Gotta Tell You (with Vinny and Dennis Cartier featuring Adannay) [Smash The House]
 2021: Universe (with Alchimyst) [Smash The House]

Remixes
 2012: Ginuwine, Timbaland and Missy Elliott - Get Involved (Wolfpack Remix) [Smash The House]
 2012: Regi and Dimitri Vegas & Like Mike - Momentum (Yves V and Wolfpack Remix) [Smash The House]
 2013: Dimitri Vegas & Like Mike, Steve Aoki, and Angger Dimas - Phat Brahms (Wolfpack Remix) [Dim Mak Records]
 2013: Nicolaz and Angelika Vee - Riot (Wolfpack Remix) [Wooha!]
 2013: Rohmir - Seal Me (Wolfpack Remix) [RBMC Music]
 2014: Flo Rida - How I Feel (Wolfpack Instrumental Mix) [Poe Boy/Atlantic]
 2015: Dimitri Vegas & Like Mike - Wakanda (Wolfpack Remix) [Musicheads Electro]
 2015: Nervo - It Feels (Wolfpack Remix) [Ultra]
 2015: Dvbbs - White Clouds'' (Wolfpack Remix) [Spinnin' Remixes]
 2017: Dimitri Vegas & Like Mike, David Guetta, and Kiiara - Complicated (Diego Miranda and Wolfpack Remix)

References

Notes
 A  Did not enter the Ultratop 50, but peaked on the Dance Bubbling Under chart.
 B  Did not enter the Ultratop 50, but peaked on the Flemish Ultratip chart.
 C  Did not enter the Ultratop 50, but peaked on the Walloon Ultratip chart.

Sources

External links
Official website
Beatport

Belgian DJs
Belgian musical duos
Belgian record producers
Belgian house music groups
Electronic dance music DJs
Electronic dance music duos
Electro house musicians
Willebroek